Bluebird, in comics, refers to:

Bluebird (Marvel Comics), a supporting character in Marvel Comics' Spider-Man series
Bluebird (DC Comics), a supporting character in DC Comics' Batman series

See also
Bluebird (disambiguation)